Grand Central Airport is a former airport in Glendale, California. Also known as Grand Central Air Terminal (GCAT), the airport was an important facility for the growing Los Angeles suburb of Glendale in the 1920s and a key element in the development of United States aviation. The terminal, located at 1310 Air Way, was built in 1928 and still exists, owned since 1997 by The Walt Disney Company as a part of its Grand Central Creative Campus (GC3). Three hangars also remain standing. The location of the single concrete  runway has been preserved, but is now a public street as the runway was dug up and converted into Grand Central Avenue.

The terminal building was added to the National Register of Historic Places on March 27, 2017.

Beginnings
The concept for the airport probably began with Leslie Coombs Brand (1859–1925), a major figure in the settlement and economic growth of the Glendale area. He had purchased land on the lower slopes of Mount Verdugo overlooking the city, and in 1904 built an imposing residence that became known as Brand Castle (which today houses the Brand Library).  Just across the mostly dry Los Angeles River he could see the Griffith Park Aerodrome's grass field, built in 1912.  Just three years later he decided to build his own grass airstrip below his mansion.  He built his first hangar in 1916, put together a fleet of planes, and held fly-in parties. The only requirement was that guests had to arrive in their own planes and bring passengers.

From this modest beginning, plans were soon hatched by local entrepreneurs to establish an airport with commercial possibilities a little further down below his field. On February 22, 1929, a terminal with a control tower had been built, and was opened to much fanfare. Designed by Henry L. Gogerty, the intention was to construct an air terminal along the lines of a classic railroad terminal. It combined a style consisting of Spanish Colonial Revival with Zig-zag Moderne influences (Art Deco). GCAT became a major airport of entry to Los Angeles and provided the first paved runway west of the Rocky Mountains.

Within a year, the entire enterprise was sold to the Curtiss-Wright Flying Service, managed by C. C. Moseley, a co-founder of the future Western Airlines. It became the city's largest employer. It was also at Grand Central that Moseley established the first of his private flying schools, Curtiss-Wright Technical Institute (later renamed Cal-Aero Academy).

Pioneering people at GCAT
Many famous aviation pioneers made their home and their mark at GCAT, as pilots, designers, mechanics, teachers, salesmen, and airplane/power-plant builders, often serving in some combination, including:

 Charles Lindbergh, who piloted the nation's first regularly scheduled coast to coast flight from Grand Central's runway as organizer of Transcontinental Air Transport which, after merging with Western Air Express, came to be Transcontinental and Western Air, later renamed Trans-World Airlines.
 Amelia Earhart used the airport and bought her first plane there.
 Laura Ingalls became the first woman to fly solo across the country when she landed at Glendale in 1930.
 Albert Forsythe and Charles Anderson were the first African American pilots who made the transcontinental flight, completed at Glendale in 1933. Their achievement paved the way for the black Tuskegee Airmen who fought in World War II.
 Thomas Benton Slate built an all-metal dirigible and hangar in 1925. He named it "City of Glendale". It left the ground briefly in 1929, popped some rivets, and crashed.
 Howard Hughes built his record-setting H-1 Racer in a small building at 911 Air Way in 1935, thus beginning the Hughes Aircraft Company. The building burned to the ground in the late 1990s.
 Jack Northrop started his Avion Aviation company on the field in 1927, where he built multi-cellular metal structures.
 William Boeing bought the business from Northrop, and moved it to Burbank's United Airport (now Hollywood Burbank Airport).
 C. C. Moseley established overhaul facilities there, and operated a flight academy whose pilot and mechanic graduates traveled to Europe as the all-volunteer Eagle Squadron who flew against Hitler at the Battle of Britain before America entered the war.
 Actor Robert Cummings was an active pilot and flight instructor who used this airport.

Airlines originating at GCA included TWA, Varney, Western, and Pickwick Airlines (1928–30).

Movies and movie stars
The airport was the setting of several films, including Howard Hughes' Hell's Angels (1930), Shirley Temple's Bright Eyes (1934), Lady Killer (1933) starring James Cagney, Sky Giant (1938) with Joan Fontaine, Hats Off (1936) with John Payne, the musical Hollywood Hotel (1937) with Dick Powell, and the adventure film Secret Service of the Air (1939) starring Ronald Reagan.  Episodes of the 1941 movie serial Sky Raiders show the terminal and other GCAT structures. The terminal was a favorite shooting location.

The airport was also known for stunt flying and supplying planes for use in the movie industry by people like Paul Mantz. Just about every airplane design flying during the 1920s, 1930s and 1940s could be seen at GCAT for use in movies, or there to be serviced.

Wartime
When Pearl Harbor was attacked on December 7, 1941, Grand Central Airport (like all other west coast airports) was immediately closed to private aviation. (The remaining airlines had already moved to Burbank.) The government moved in, heavily camouflaged the place, and converted it into an important defense base for Los Angeles. In 1942 the runway, which originally ended at Sonora Avenue, was extended North to Western Avenue, giving it a 5,000' length to accommodate large airplanes and future jet aircraft.

Training of United States Army Air Forces flying cadets began under contract to Grand Central Flying School, Cal-Aero Training Corporation, and Polaris Flight Academy. The facility was assigned to West Coast Training Center (later Western Flying Training Command) as a primary (level 1) pilot training airfield, which also instructed Royal Air Force flying cadets.  Some who would go on to become members of the Eagle Squadrons.  (71 Squadron: Bob Sprague, J.J. Lynch, 121 Squadron: Kenneth Holder, Don McLeod, Jim Peck, Forrest Cox, John Lynch. 133 Squadron: James Coxetter, Hugh Brown).  The Fairchild PT-19 was the primary flight trainer, along with Vultee BT-13s.  The Grand Central Flying School (GCFS) started out at the airfield and evolved into the Cal-Aero Flight Academy (CAFA).  Cal-Aero had schools at Ontario, Mira Loma at Oxnard, and Polaris at War Eagle Field. Glendale Junior College staffed flight ground school at Grand Central Air Field.

A P-38 training base was built on the west side near the river which prepared the 319th Fighter Wing for action in Europe. Hundreds of P-51s, C-47s, B-25s and others transitioned Grand Central Airport in Glendale for refurbishment and reconditioning. Larger aircraft, like the B-29, were sent to the Grand Central Service Center in Tucson, Arizona.

On April 14, 1944, a fire destroyed three buildings, burned seven aircraft, and injured five workmen, one of them seriously.

Postwar

In 1947 the runway was cut back to 3,800' (southeast of Sonora Ave) due to pressure from local government. The airport was returned to private use, renamed Grand Central Airport, ceased to be profitable, and was closed in 1959  to make way for the development of the Grand Central Business Park.  Before its closing, the airport hosted a SCCA National Sports Car Championship race on November 13, 1955 that attracted 6,000 spectators.  The closed airport was then used as a private heliport for the Los Angeles Police Department's fleet of police helicopters, some Bell 47s ("recips") and some Bell 206s ("Jet Rangers"), until the new LAPD Hooper Heliport opened on top of the Piper Tech Building in downtown Los Angeles in 1983.

In 1961, WED Enterprises then a part of Retlaw Enterprises, opened a creative workshop in the business park.

Major Corliss C. Moseley established the Grand Central Rocket Company in the vicinity of Grand Central Air Terminal in 1955. It was there that the third stages of early Vanguard rockets, including the first two to reach orbit, were built.

Grand Central Creative Campus

Plans were announced for the Grand Central Creative Campus redevelopment of the Grand Central Business Park in September 1999. Additional details were released in March 2000 indicating that it would have 3.6 million square feet in several four to six story buildings for office, production and sound stages and hold 10,000 employees. In 2001, The Walt Disney Co. was planning to expand at the location from a single building to a campus of 6 million square feet. In early May 2004, the Disney Company received design approval for its first phase of this redevelopment. This expected to spearhead the redevelopment of the San Fernando corridor of Glendale. This phase consisted of two 125,000-square-foot office buildings on a company owned 100-acre lot at 1101 and 1133 Flower St. which were to fit in with the Art Deco motif design of the KABC-TV studio facility nearby the campus (KABC had relocated from their previous home base at The Prospect Studios, formerly the ABC Television Center West). A Disney employee day care for the campus was given design approval in July 2008. Disney's Pixar sequel unit, Circle 7 Animation, was started in a converted warehouse on Circle 7 Drive in 2004, only to be closed in 2006.

The campus' second phase began construction in September 2010 on a 338,000-square-foot six-story building with a five-story wing and a parking structure. 1,200 employees were expected to be working in the new building. In mid-November 2018, the Disney Stores USA headquarters moved out of the Royal Laundry Complex to G3C.

Disney units on the campus are:
Circle 7 Animation (2004-2006)
Disney Television Animation
DisneyToon Studios (1990-2018)
Marvel Animation, 623 Circle Seven Drive
The Disney Children's Center, Inc.
Walt Disney Imagineering (1961–present)
Disney Store headquarters
 Mickey's of Glendale, Imagineering exclusive store

The KABC-TV studios are adjacent to the campus, but not a part of it.

See also

 Glendale Register of Historic Resources and Historic Districts
 Portal of the Folded Wings Shrine to Aviation
 California World War II Army Airfields
 Ed Dyess

Notes

External links
Free Tours of Grand Central Air Terminal & Museum 

Grand Central Air Terminal  by the City of Glendale
Grand Central Air Terminal Register by Delta Mike Airfield

Abandoned & Little-Known Airfields: Glendale Airport / Grand Central Air Terminal by Paul Freeman

History of the San Fernando Valley
Defunct airports in California
Aviation history of the United States
1928 establishments in California
History of Los Angeles County, California
Airports in Los Angeles County, California
Airfields of the United States Army Air Forces in California
Transportation in Glendale, California
Buildings and structures in Glendale, California
Airports established in 1928
Buildings and structures on the National Register of Historic Places in Los Angeles County, California
Air transportation buildings and structures on the National Register of Historic Places
Historic American Buildings Survey in California
The Walt Disney Company